The Azerbaijan women's national basketball team represents Azerbaijan in international women's basketball competitions.

Competitive record

Women's European Championship for Small Countries

Notable players
Tiffany Hayes
Aneika Henry

See also
 Azerbaijan men's national basketball team
 Azerbaijan Basketball Federation

References

External links
 Azerbaijan Basketball Federation (Official Website) 

Women's national basketball teams
Azerbaijan national basketball team